Franco Axel Chiviló (born 28 April 1991) is an Argentine professional soccer player who plays as a midfielder.

Career
Chiviló began his youth career at the Argentine tournament Torneo Clausura 2010, for Club Atlético Huracán. He made his professional footballing debut on 27 February 2010, but has not performed up to par in his career. His club Huracán finished last three in the Primera División and costed them to relegate into a lower division.

Thereafter, he enjoyed a two-year deal with Union Magdalena before joining Geylang International as a marquee player in the S.League in 2014.

References

1991 births
Living people
Argentine footballers
Argentine expatriate footballers
Association football midfielders
Club Atlético Huracán footballers
Unión Magdalena footballers
Geylang International FC players
Deportivo Merlo footballers
All Boys footballers
Club Atlético Platense footballers
Flandria footballers
Club Sportivo Estudiantes players
Argentine Primera División players
Singapore Premier League players
Primera Nacional players
Primera B Metropolitana players
Expatriate footballers in Colombia
Expatriate footballers in Singapore
Argentine expatriate sportspeople in Colombia